This article lists political parties in Niger.
Niger has a multi-party system, with two to three strong political parties and smaller parties electorally successful to take seats in the National Assembly.  These smaller parties frequently enter into electoral coalitions with their more powerful opponents, forming blocs in both government and opposition.

Party naming
Nigerien political parties are commonly known both by their acronyms and a nickname.  The latter tradition began prior to independence with the Nigerien Democratic Union-Sawaba.  Sawaba ("Freedom" in Hausa) became the most common name of the party.  Today all large parties have an official "nickname", usually in Hausa, Djerma or other national languages, while the official party name is in French.

Multi-party democracy
Niger banned all opposition parties from 1959 (prior to independence) to 1991.  During the First Republic (1960-1974), the PPN-RDA was the sole party.  From 1987-1991, MNSD-Nassara was the only legal party.  Both parties survive in somewhat altered forms.

Parties

Parties represented in parliament

Smaller contemporary parties
Nigerien Self-Management Party PNA-Al'ouma (Parti Nigérien pour l’Autogestion-Al'ouma)
Republican Party for Liberty and Progress-Nakowa PRLPN-Nakowa
Party for Socialism and Democracy in Niger  PSDN-Alheri (Parti pour le socialisme et la démocratie au Niger-Alheri)
Union for Democracy and Social Progress-Amana   UDPS-Amana
Union for Democracy and the Republic UDR-Tabbat (Union pour la Démocratie et la République-Tabbat)
Union of Independent Nigeriens UNI (Union des Nigériens Indépendants)
Union of Democratic and Progressive Patriots-Chamoua UPDP-Chamoua
Nigerien Development Party

Previously dominant parties
Democratic and Social Convention CDS-Rahama (Convention démocratique et sociale-Rahama)
Nigerien Progressive Party – African Democratic Rally PPN-RDA (Parti Progressiste Nigérien-Rassemblement Démocratique Nigerien)  
Union of Popular Forces for Democracy and Progress-Sawaba UDFP-Sawaba
Nigerien Action Bloc (BNA): 1946–53/1956–57
Union of Nigerien Independents and Sympathisers (UNIS) 1953–57
Party of Independents, Niger–East (Parti Independent du Niger-Est, PINE) 1948–53
Nigerien Democratic Front (FDN) 1956–58

Coalitions
Alliance of the Forces of Change (AFC): a nine (later six) party coalition from 1991-1996.  Ruling coalition from 1993-1994.
Union for the Franco-African Community (UCFA): PPN led pro-French Union coalition: 1958.
Coordination of Democratic Forces (CFD, Coordination des forces démocratiques): 11 party opposition coalition from 2004.  Led by PNDS.  Included  PPN,  PNA-Al'ouma,  UNI, UDR-Tabbat.

See also
 Politics of Niger
 List of political parties by country

References

Samuel Decalo. Historical Dictionary of Niger (3rd ed.). Scarecrow Press, Boston & Folkestone, 1997. pp. 247–255 ("Political Parties").  

Niger
Political Parties
 
Niger
Political parties